is a Japanese businessman who is the current CEO of the Nissan Motor Corporation.

Education 

Uchida graduated from Doshisha University in 1991 with a degree in Theology.

Career 

After he graduated, Uchida joined Nissho Iwai (currently Sojitz), a sogo shosha (general trading company) based in Tokyo, in April 1991.

Uchida joined Nissan for the first time in October 2003, and was named manager in October 2006. In September 2012, he left Nissan to join Renault Samsung Motors for less than 2 years. He then re-joined Nissan as a Program Director in April 2014.

His Nissan executive career started in November 2016 when he was named Corporate VP of the Alliance Purchasing department. He became President of Dongfeng Motor Co., Ltd. and Senior VP in April 2018. One year later, in April 2019, he was also named Chairman of the Management Committee for China.

In October 2019, Uchida was unanimously chosen by the board of directors to become the new Nissan CEO, taking office on December 1, 2019.

Personal
Uchida can speak fluent English along with his native Japanese.

References 

Chief executives in the automobile industry
Japanese chief executives
Doshisha University alumni
21st-century Japanese businesspeople
1966 births
Living people